Takarakuni Minoru (born 16 August 1956 as Minoru Saisu) is a former sumo wrestler from Higashi, Fukushima, Japan. He made his professional debut in July 1971, joining the original Isegahama stable, recruited by former yokozuna Terukuni, and reached the top division in March 1982. His highest rank was maegashira 2. Following his retirement from active competition he remained in the sumo world as a sewanin under his real name Saisu, and was a member of Asahiyama stable and then the new Isegahama stable. He reached the mandatory retirement age of 65 for sumo personnel in August 2021 and left his position.

Career record

See also
Glossary of sumo terms
List of past sumo wrestlers
List of sumo tournament second division champions

References

1956 births
Living people
Japanese sumo wrestlers
Sumo people from Fukushima Prefecture